Teo Quintero León (born 22 March 1999) is a professional footballer who plays as a centre-back for Challenger Pro League club Deinze. Born in Spain, he has opted to play for the Venezuela national team.

Club career
Quintero is a youth product of CB Cinc Copes, Damm and Girona. He began his senior career with Peralada, a subsidiary of Girona but was hampered by injuries.

International career
Quintero was born in Spain to Venezuelan parents and is a dual citizen. He was called up to the Venezuela national team for the friendly matches against Iceland and United Arab Emirates on 22 and 27 September 2022, respectively.

References

External links
 

1999 births
Living people
Spanish people of Venezuelan descent
Venezuelan footballers
Spanish footballers
Association football defenders
Challenger Pro League players
CF Peralada players
Hércules CF players
CE Sabadell FC footballers
K.M.S.K. Deinze players
20th-century Venezuelan people
Venezuelan expatriate footballers
Spanish expatriate footballers
Venezuelan expatriate sportspeople in Belgium
Spanish expatriate sportspeople in Belgium
Expatriate footballers in Belgium